The List of Ottoman Battles In Which The Sultans Participated In is shown below. Note that the sieges are not included in the list. For a complete list of all battles involving the Ottoman Empire see the List of battles involving the Ottoman Empire.

Image gallery of the sultans

References

Sources 
Prof. Yaşar Yüce-Prof. Ali Sevim: Türkiye tarihi Cilt II, AKDTYKTTK Yayınları, İstanbul, 1991
Prof. Yaşar Yüce-Prof. Ali Sevim: Türkiye tarihi Cilt III, AKDTYKTTK Yayınları, İstanbul, 1991
Gabor Agoston-Bruce Masters:Encyclopaedia of the Ottoman Empire 
Nicolae Iorga:Geschiste des Osmanischen Reiches II (translated by Nilüfer Epçeli) Yeditepe yayınevi, İstanbul, 
Encyclopædia Britannica, Expo'70 ed. Vol 22

Battles involving the Ottoman Empire
Ottoman Empire military-related lists
Ottoman Empire-related lists
Sultans of the Ottoman Empire
Turkey history-related lists